Matthew Harper (born November 26, 1984) is an American football coach and is the current assistant special teams coach of the San Francisco 49ers. He previously was a coach for the City College of San Francisco, Oregon Ducks, and Philadelphia Eagles. In 2005, he was awarded First Team All-Nor-Cal Conference and was given the All-America honor. In 2017, he won Super Bowl LII with the Eagles. In 2021, he became the Assistant Special Teams Coach of the San Francisco 49ers.

Playing career
Harper began playing in college at City College of San Francisco where he spent two seasons. He then transferred to Oregon and played defensive back for the Ducks in 2006 and 2007.

References

1984 births
Living people
San Francisco 49ers coaches
Philadelphia Eagles coaches
Oregon Ducks football players
Oregon Ducks football coaches
American football wide receivers
People from Secaucus, New Jersey
Sportspeople from Hudson County, New Jersey